Shaun Michael Taylor-Corbett (born October 6, 1978) is an American actor, singer and writer.  He is the son of choreographer Lynne Taylor-Corbett and Music Executive Michael Corbett. Taylor-Corbett is of Native American descent and has three sisters.

Life and works
Taylor-Corbett graduated from the University of Delaware, where he sang for an a cappella group called the University of Delaware YChromes. He was also the vice president of the university's World Peace Club and was an honors student. He received vocal training from Shirley Callaway.

After college, Taylor-Corbett joined The New York Public Theater, where he performed Shakespeare. He also joined the Harrington Theater Arts Company and appeared on the soap opera All My Children many times. Taylor-Corbett also played Romeo in Shakespeare's Romeo and Juliet at the McCarter Theater in Princeton, New Jersey.

In 2003, Taylor-Corbett joined the American counterpart to the Australian kids' show of the same name. In Hi-5, his segment is Shapes in Space, where he would play with play objects, as if they were real life objects, like a giant pyramid and a tunnel. Taylor-Corbett would also explain the functions of shapes as well as performing three songs in each show: solo and as part of the Hi-5 band.

Taylor-Corbett left Hi-5 in 2006 to further pursue his performing career.  He played Juan in the hit Off-Broadway musical Altar Boyz from July 3, 2006 – May 6, 2007. He also appeared on Broadway in the play In the Heights.

References

External links

1978 births
Living people
University of Delaware alumni
American male actors
American people who self-identify as being of Native American descent
American children's musicians